Sara Nanni (born 1987) is a German politician of the Alliance 90/The Greens who has been serving as a member of the Bundestag since the 2021 German federal election, representing the Düsseldorf II district.

Early life and education
Nanni holds a master’s degree in peace and conflict studies from TU Darmstadt.

Political career
In parliament, Nanni has been serving on the Defence Committee and the Subcommittee on the United Nations. In 2022, she also joined the parliamentary body charged with overseeing a 100 billion euro special fund to strengthen Germany’s armed forces. She is her parliamentary group’s spokesperson on defense policy.

In addition to her committee assignments, Nanni has been a member of the German delegation to the Franco-German Parliamentary Assembly since 2022.

Other activities
 Federal Academy for Security Policy (BAKS), Member of the Advisory Board (since 2022)
 Heinrich Böll Foundation, Member of the Europe/Transatlantic Advisory Board (since 2022)
 German United Services Trade Union (ver.di), Member
 Amnesty International, Member

References

External links 
 

Living people
1987 births
People from Datteln
21st-century German politicians
21st-century German women politicians
Members of the Bundestag for Alliance 90/The Greens
Members of the Bundestag 2021–2025
Female members of the Bundestag